The 2012 J.League Cup, also known as the 2012 J.League Yamazaki Nabisco Cup for sponsoring purposes, was the 37th edition of the most prestigious Japanese soccer league cup tournament and the 20th edition under the current J.League Cup format.

Kashima Antlers became the winners for two straight years and qualify for the 2013 Suruga Bank Championship.

Format
Teams from the J.League Division 1 will take part in the tournament. FC Tokyo, Gamba Osaka, Kashiwa Reysol and Nagoya Grampus were given a bye to the quarter-finals due to qualification in the 2012 AFC Champions League. The remaining 14 teams started from the group stage, where they were divided into two groups of seven. The group winners and the runners-up of each group qualified for the quarter-final along with the four teams which qualified for the AFC Champions League.

Group stage

Standings

Group A

Group B

Results

Group A

Group B

Knock-out stage
All times are Japan Standard Time (UTC+9)

Quarter-finals

First leg

Second leg

Semifinals

First leg

Second leg

Final

Goalscorers

References

J.League Cup
Lea